James Cropper (1862–1938) was an Anglican priest in the 20th century.

He was  educated at Charterhouse School and Trinity College, Cambridge. He held incumbencies at  West Ham, Seaton,  Broughton-in-Furness  and Penrith after which he was Dean of Gibraltar. Returning to England in 1927 he became Rector of Penshurst then Tonbridge before his last appointment as Master of Lord Leycester's Hospital, Warwick. He died on  11 January 1938

Notes

People educated at Charterhouse School
Alumni of Trinity College, Cambridge
Deans of Gibraltar
1938 deaths
1862 births